This is a summary of the year 2007 in British television.

Events

January

February

March

April

May

June

July

August

September

October

November

December

Debuts

BBC One

BBC Two

BBC Three

BBC Four

ITV (1/2/3/4/CITV)

Channel 4

Five

Other channels

Changes of network affiliation

 It later moved to Bravo in early 2008

Channels

New channels

Defunct channels

Rebranded channels

Television shows

Returning this year after a break of one year or longer

Continuing television shows

1920s
BBC Wimbledon (1927–1939, 1946–2019, 2021–present)

1930s
The Boat Race (1938–1939, 1946–2019)

1950s
Panorama (1953–present)
What the Papers Say (1956–2008)
The Sky at Night (1957–present)
Blue Peter (1958–present)

1960s
Coronation Street (1960–present)
Songs of Praise (1961–present)
Doctor Who (1963–1989, 1996, 2005–present)
Match of the Day (1964–present)
Top of the Pops (1964–present)
The Money Programme (1966–2010)

1970s
Emmerdale (1972–present)
Newsround (1972–present)
Last of the Summer Wine (1973–2010)
Arena (1975–present)
One Man and His Dog (1976–present)
Top Gear (1977–2001, 2002–present)
Grange Hill (1978–2008)
Ski Sunday (1978–present)
Antiques Roadshow (1979–present)
Question Time (1979–present)

1980s
Children in Need (1980–present)
Postman Pat (1981, 1991, 1994, 1996, 2004–2008)
Timewatch (1982–present)
Countdown (1982–present)
The Bill (1984–2010)
Channel 4 Racing (1984–2016)
Thomas & Friends (1984–present)
EastEnders (1985–present)
Comic Relief (1985–present)
Casualty (1986–present)
ChuckleVision (1987–2009)
Fireman Sam (1987–1994, 2005–2013)
This Morning (1988–present)
The Simpsons (1989–present)

1990s
Have I Got News for You (1990–present)
A Touch of Frost (1992–2010)
Heartbeat (1992–2010)
Time Team (1994–2013)
Room 101 (1994–2007, 2012–present)
The National Lottery Draws (1994–2017)
Top of the Pops 2 (1994–present)
Hollyoaks (1995–present)
Arthur (1996–present)
Never Mind the Buzzcocks (1996–2015)
Silent Witness (1996–present)
Midsomer Murders (1997–present)
King of the Hill (1997–2010)
South Park (1997–present)
Airline (1998–2007)
Who Wants to Be a Millionaire? (1998–2014)
Bob the Builder (1998–present)
Bremner, Bird and Fortune (1999–2010)
Ed, Edd n Eddy (1999–2009)
SpongeBob SquarePants (1999–present)
Family Guy (1999–2002, 2005–present)
Holby City (1999–2022)

2000s
The Weakest Link (2000–2012, 2017–present)
Big Brother (2000–2010, 2011–2018)
My Family (2000–2011)
Real Crime (2001–2011)
Flog It! (2002–2020)
Foyle's War (2002–2015)
I'm a Celebrity...Get Me Out of Here! (2002–present)
Harry Hill's TV Burp (2002–2012)
Spooks (2002–2011)
Daily Politics (2003–2018)
New Tricks (2003–2015)
Peep Show (2003–2015)
All Grown Up! (2003–2008)
Tiny Pop (2003–2008)
Politics Show (2003–2011)
QI (2003–present)
The Royal (2003–2011)
This Week (2003–2019)
Doc Martin (2004–2019)
Sea of Souls (2004–2007)
Supernanny (2004–2008, 2010–2012)
Shameless (2004–2013)
Strictly Come Dancing (2004–present)
The X Factor (2004–2018)
More4 News (2005—2009)
Love Soup (2005–2008)
Come Dine with Me (2005–present)
The Jeremy Kyle Show (2005–2019)
It's Me or the Dog (2005–2012)
Deal or No Deal (2005–2016)
Sunday AM (2005–2021)
Mock the Week (2005–present)
Dancing on Ice (2006–2014)
Don't Get Done, Get Dom (2006–2016)
Hotel Babylon (2006–2009)
Numberjacks (2006–2009)
Robin Hood (2006–2009)
That Mitchell and Webb Look (2006–2010)
Torchwood (2006–2011)
Waterloo Road (2006–2015)
Star Stories (2006–2008)
Ugly Betty (2006–2010)

Big Brother racism controversy

2007 saw Channel 4 reality show Big Brother involved in two high-profile race-rows.

Celebrity Big Brother 5
In January, Jade Goody, her mother Jackiey Budden and boyfriend Jack Tweed, along with Danielle Lloyd and Jo O'Meara, were accused of racist bullying towards Bollywood actress Shilpa Shetty. This resulted in protests in India and a record number of complaints to British TV regulator Ofcom and to Channel 4.

Big Brother 8
At the end of May, Channel 4 broadcast an apology for not intervening in the bullying just moments before the eight non-celebrity series started; all housemates in this series were given strict warnings about racism before entering. Just one week after the launch, Emily Parr was removed from the house in the early hours of the morning for saying the word "nigger" to black housemate Charley Uchea just hours before. This incident was widely discussed in the media; viewers complained about Channel 4 broadcasting the word, however, other viewers complained that Emily had been treated unfairly, as she did not use the word in a spiteful context, instead possibly imitating rappers who use the word in their songs.

Ending this year

Top 10 highest rated shows of 2007

Death

See also
 2007 in British music
 2007 in British radio
 2007 in the United Kingdom
 List of British films of 2007

References